Sambhu Chandra Ghose, M.A, LL.B. was the Chief Justice of the Calcutta High Court from 1981 to 1983. He became the Chief Justice after Hon'ble Justice Amarendra Nath Sen. His son Justice Pinaki Chandra Ghose was the first Lokpal and former Judge of Supreme Court of India.

References

Judges of the Calcutta High Court
Chief Justices of the Calcutta High Court
People from Kolkata
Year of death unknown